Bytków may refer to the following places in Poland:
Bytków, Lower Silesian Voivodeship (south-west Poland)
Bytków, Opole Voivodeship (south-west Poland)